Poulton-le-Fylde railway station serves the town of Poulton-le-Fylde in Lancashire, England.

History

The railway to the fishing town of Fleetwood passed along a straight line east of the town. From 1846, there was a junction to Blackpool just north of the station, with tight connecting curves facing either way. In 1893 a fatal accident occurred when a train took the curve too fast. Subsequently, in 1896, the tracks were realigned to follow a much gentler westward curve to Blackpool, with the new station halfway along the curve. The Fleetwood branch then curved to the east to rejoin the original alignment. The old station continued to be used as a goods station until 1968.

Passenger services to Fleetwood were withdrawn by British Rail on 1 June 1970 during railway restructuring, although a freight service continued to the ICI plant at  until 1999. The line is still extant (albeit overgrown and disused), but the junction with the Blackpool line west of the station was removed in April 2017 in preparation for electrification of the route. Since June 2006, there have been plans to restore (and preserve) the passenger rail link towards Fleetwood via Thornton & Cleveleys, as a heritage railway; a £30,000 feasibility study is needed to be undertaken to explore the re-instatement of the link and the addition of a third platform at Poulton-le-Fylde.

Facilities

The station has a staffed ticket office at street level, staffed throughout the week (Monday to Saturday 06:10-19:30 and Sunday 06:40-18:10).  There is also a self-service ticket machine provided for use outside these times and for collecting pre-paid tickets.  There is a waiting room at platform level, along with toilets, bench seating and timetable posters.  Train running information is offered via automatic announcements and digital display screens.  Step-free access is available via lifts from the entrance to the platform when the ticket office is staffed.

Services

Additionally, on weekdays, one Avanti West Coast train per day to  calls at the station in the southbound direction only, departing at 0536. 

Modernisation

The modernisation and electrification of the Preston to Blackpool North line, and hence Poulton-le-Fylde station  was announced in December 2009. The modernisation included completely new signalling of the entire line along with rationalisation of the lines and removal of the connection into the Fleetwood branch. The removal of the signal box along with four others along the line was included as part of the works. This resulted in a total blockade of the line from 11 November 2017 until 25 March 2018 but subsequently extended to 16 April 2018 due to bad weather.

Visual reporting point
The station is a visual reporting point (VRP) for general aviation aircraft in the local Blackpool airspace.

Notes

References
 Mitchell, L. & Hartley, S. (2005)  , Lancashire County Council Environment Directorate, accessed 30 October 2007
 Suggitt, G. (2003, revised 2004) Lost Railways of Lancashire, Countryside Books, Newbury, 
 Welch, M.S. (2004) Lancashire Steam Finale, Runpast Publishing, Cheltenham,

External links

Blackpool & Fylde Rail Users’ Association—Poulton, accessed 17 October 2007
Poulton & Wyre Railway Society, working towards restoring the passenger rail link to Fleetwood.

Railway stations in the Borough of Wyre
DfT Category E stations
Buildings and structures in Poulton-le-Fylde
Former Preston and Wyre Joint Railway stations
Railway stations in Great Britain opened in 1840
Railway stations served by Avanti West Coast
Northern franchise railway stations